Justin Francis (born February 2, 1989 in Opa-locka, Florida), is an American football Defensive end. He played college football for Rutgers and went un-drafted in the 2012 NFL Draft. He was later signed in 2012 as a free agent with the New England Patriots.

References 

1989 births
Living people
Players of American football from Florida
American football defensive ends
Rutgers Scarlet Knights football players
New England Patriots players
Portland Thunder players
Portland Steel players
Nebraska Danger players
Miramar High School alumni